, is a Japanese pop singer and occasional actress. She is as a member of the band Do As Infinity (DAI), along with Ryo Owatari and Dai Nagao, that has resumed activities after their 2005 split.

Career

Do As Infinity

Beginnings as solo artist 
Tomiko Van began as a solo artist while she was with Do As Infinity with the song "Again", which appeared on the charity album Song Nation, and later in 2003 with the song "Drive me nuts", which was recorded for trance DJs project Cyber X. Van also appeared in six commercials for the Japanese hair product company Lavenus.

Official solo career

2005
After Do As Infinity disbanded on September 29, 2005, Avex Trax, Van's label, announced that the singer was going solo.

2006 
In 2006, Van made her debut as a solo artist with her album Farewell. Singles were not released prior to her album, released in March 2006. Her first official single as a solo artist, "Flower", was released in June of the same year, and made the weekly top ten of the Japanese charts. Two other singles followed that year, "Senkō", in September, and "Yumeji", a late November release.

2007 
2007 started out with Van's first cover album titled Voice: Cover You With Love. The album was Van's only release that year. Tomiko van also acted in a movie Heat Island.

2008 
In 2008, Van's third album and second cover album, Voice 2: Cover Lovers Rock, was released in March. In this album, she covered songs performed by male artists, such as Spitz and Masaharu Fukuyama. Despite her one-year hiatus from the music scene, the album charted at number 10 on the first day of release. Van's fourth solo single, "Tokyo Biyori", was released on June 18, 2008. Her second original album, Van, was released in December 2008.

On September 29, 2008, Do As Infinity officially reunited as a band, and released a four-track single on June 17, 2009.

Personal life 
Van married a man four years her junior in September 2012, first publicly announcing her marriage at a Do As Infinity concert at Shibuya AX in Tokyo on September 29. As of 2016 she is the mother of two children. She divorced her husband in July 2018.

Discography

Singles

Albums

Music videos

Featured and collaborative releases 
 "Drive Me Nuts" (Cyber X feat. Tomiko Van)
 "Truth'94 -Meets Tomiko Van-" (cover version of TRF's original song)
 "Again" (various artists album, Song Nation, an Avex project consisting of collaborations between many different Avex artists)
 "Music Flower" (Kohey Tsuchiya & various artists)
 "Velvet" (Kikkawa Kouji)

References

External links 
  
 

1979 births
Avex Group artists
Japanese women pop singers
Japanese women rock singers
Japanese actresses
Living people
People from Kumamoto Prefecture
Musicians from Kumamoto Prefecture
20th-century Japanese women singers
20th-century Japanese singers
21st-century Japanese women singers
21st-century Japanese singers